the Lords of Robecque, (Robecq) belonged to the Feudal Belgian nobility, Robecque is in Artois, now France.

List of Lords of Robecque 

Antoinette the Saveuse, Dame of Robecq;married to Charles of Hallewyn.
Margereth of Halewyn, Lady of Robecq;married to Louis of Yves.
Jacqueline of Yves, Lady of Robecq;Married to John IV of Saint-Omer

House of Saint-Omer 

John IV of Saint-Omer;married to Jacqueline of Yves, lady of Robecque. 
Louis of Saint-Omer, Lord of Robecque.
Robert of Saint-Omer, 1st Baron of Robecque; died 1617; without heirs.
John V of Saint-Omer, 2nd Baron of Robecque

House of Montmorency 

Louis of Montmorency, Lord of Beuvry killed in 1585 Ostend.married to Jeanne de Saint-Omer, Lady of Robecque.
François of Montmorency, 4th Baron of Robecque.
Jean of Montmorency, 1st Prince of Robecque; died 1631, Knight of the Golden Fleece.married to Madeleine de Lens.
Eugène of Montmorency, 2nd Prince of Robecque: died 1683, Knight of the Golden Fleece.Married to Marguerite of Arenberg.
Philippe of Montmorency, 3rd Prince of Robecque: died 1691married to Philippine of Croy.
Charles of Montmorency, 4th Prince of Robecque:married to Isabelle of Croy. No heirs.
Anne I Auguste of Montmorency, 5th prince of Robecque;married to Catherine du Bellay.
Anne II Louis of Montmorency, 6th prince of Robecque
Anne III Louis of Montmorency, 7th prince of Robecque
Gaston of Montmorency, 8th prince of Robecque
Anne Charlotte of Montmorency;married to Emmanuel de Cossé, Count of Brissac

House of Cosse Brissac 

Emmanuel de Cossé-Brissac, prince of Robecque (1793–1870),
Henri de Cossé-Brissac, Prince of Robecque (1822–1887)
Louis-Henri de Cossé-Brissac, Prince of Robecque (1852–1925),
Marie-Jeanne de Cossé-Brissac (1884–1951);married to Guy de Lévis-Mirepoix (1879–1940)
Emmanuel de Lévis-Mirepoix, Prince of Robecque (1909–1951)
Guy-Emmanuel de Lévis-Mirepoix, Prince of Robecque(* 1947)

References

Rob
Robecque
Saint-Omer family
Lists of Belgian nobility
Nobility of the Spanish Netherlands